Interlinear annotation can mean:
 Ruby text
 Interlinear gloss
 Kanbun